Beržai is a village in Kėdainiai district municipality, in Kaunas County, central Lithuania. It is located by the Kruostas river and Vaidatoniai pond, 4 km from Dotnuva. According to the 2011 census, the village has a population of 214 people. There is an ancient burial place in Beržai.

Demography

References

Villages in Kaunas County
Kėdainiai District Municipality